Humpback may refer to:

 Humpback whale
 Humpback dolphin
 Humpback salmon
 Humpback bridge
 Humpback, a common name for the fish Chanodichthys dabryi
 Humpback, a variant of hunchback

Animal common name disambiguation pages